The T(ea)-rules (T(hee)-regels), are a set of conjugation rules used in the Dutch language to determine whether the second person singular/plural and the first and third person singular of a verb end in -t or not. These rules are related to the 't kofschip-rule, which is used to determine the verb end for past tenses and participles. The combined sets of rules are also known as the d/t-rules.

Ik drink nooit t(hee) (I (ik) never drink t(ea))
Jij drinkt alleen t(hee) (als 'je' tegenwoordig is en voorafgaat aan 'drinkt') (You (jij) only drink t(ea) (if 'you' is present and precedes drinks (drinkt)) (informal)
Gij drinkt altijd t(hee) (Thou (gij) always drinkst t(ea)) (archaic/informal in Belgium)
U drinkt enkel t(hee) (als 'u' tegenwoordig is) (You (U/u) only drink t(ea)) (if 'you' is present) (formal)
Hij drinkt enkel t(hee) (als 'hij' tegenwoordig is) (He (hij) only drinks t(ea)) (if 'he' is present)

Second person pronouns
The pronoun jij/je only calls for the verb to end in -t if it precedes the verb, and if the verb is in the present simple  or present perfect indicative. Modal verbs and the future/conditional auxiliary zullen allow forms with and without -t (but the subject pronoun must still precede the verb for the -t form to appear).

Jij gaat naar school. ("You go to school", simple present indicative, jij precedes verb)
Ga jij naar school? ("Do you go to school?", jij does not precede verb)
Je zou naar school gaan. ("You would go to school", conditional auxiliary)
Jij ging naar school. ("You went to school", past tense)
Je kan naar school gaan. ("You can go to school", modal form without t)
Je kunt naar school gaan. ("You can go to school", modal t-form, je precedes verb)
Kun je naar school gaan? ("Can you go to school?", modal, je does not precede verb)
Je zal naar school gaan. ("You will go to school", future auxiliary without t)
Je zult naar school gaan. ("You will go to school", future auxiliary t-form, je precedes verb)
Zul je naar school gegaan zijn? ("Will you have gone to school?", future auxiliary, je does not precede verb)

If the stem of the verb ends in -t, the jij form always ends in -t:

Jij rust. ("You rest", je precedes verb)
Rust jij? ("Do you rest?", je does not precede verb)

With the verbs houden, rijden and verbs derived from them, the -d of the radical can be dropped if it is not followed by -t. In a formal context, usually the d is not dropped.

Hou jij van bloemen ("Do you like flowers?")
Houd jij van bloemen ("Do you like flowers?", formal)
Jij houdt van bloemen ("You like flowers", jij precedes verb)

Jullie (2nd plural)
The pronoun jullie always makes the verb end in -en. The ending -t is also possible, but this form is archaic (although it does survive in Brabantian dialect).

Jullie lopen naar school. ("You walk to school")
Jullie loopt naar school. ("You/ye walk to school", archaic)

Gij/ge (2nd sing./plur.)
The pronoun gij/ge makes the verb end in -t, whether the pronoun precede or follow the verb. Modal and auxiliary forms also end in -t. This pronoun is used informally in spoken language in North Brabant and Flanders only. Its written form only appears in archaic texts where it compares to English thou.

Gij gaat naar school. ("Thou goest to school", present indicative, gij precedes)
Gaat gij naar school. ("Dost thou go to school?" / "Goest thou to school?", gij follows)
Ge zoudt naar school gaan. ("Thou wouldst go to school", conditional)
Gij gingt naar school. ("Thou wentst to school", past)
Ge kunt naar school gaan. ("Thou canst go to school", modal)

No extra -t is added if the verb stem already end in -t. The ending -t is added after -d:
Gij rust. ("Thou restest")
Houdt gij van bloemen? ("Dost thou like flowers?" / "Likest thou flowers?")
Gij houdt van bloemen ("Thou likest flowers")

In the subjunctive and in the regular past, the -t survives only as an archaic form:

Gij neme(t) een lepel suiker. ("Thou takest a spoon of sugar" / "That thou mayst take a spoon of sugar", present subjunctive)
Werkte(t) ge hard? ("Didst thou work hard?" / "Workedst thou hard?", regular past)

In informal speech (only in Flanders/Brabant), the verb ends in -de or -te, if gij follows the verb. In very informal speech (only in Flanders/Brabant), the subject is dropped altogether. The -e ending after the stem is a remnant of the Middle Dutch pronoun di which, over the centuries, developed into a clitic.

Zijde gij blind! Ziede dat nu niet? ("Are you blind! Didn't (you) see that?", informal)

Third person singular and u/U
The rules for third person singular subjects and the pronoun u/U  (2nd person sing./plur.) are the same: the verb takes -t in the simple present and present perfect tense of the indicative. Modal verbs and zullen (will) have forms without -t. This pronoun is formal and is used in both written and spoken language. The spelling with a capital U is very formal and is used for royalty or deities.

Hij gaat naar school. ("He goes to school", present indicative)
Gaat u naar school. ("Do you go to school", present indicative)
Hij zou naar school gaan. ("He would go to school", conditional)
U ging naar school. ("You went to school", past)
Zij kan naar school gaan. ("She can go to school", modal)

The first person singular for non-modal verb is identical to the radical. The form can end in a vowel or in a consonant (including t). For the verbs houden, rijden and their derivatives, the -d of the radical can be dropped in spoken language. In a formal context, the d is not dropped.
Ik ga naar school ("I go to school")
Ik rust ("I rest", radical ends in t)
Ik hou van bloemen ("I love flowers", form without -d)
Ik houd van bloemen ("I love flowers", form with -d, formal)

See also
 Dutch conjugation

Notes

Grammar
Dutch language